The 2003 Radio Disney Music Awards was held at the Radio Disney studios. Hilary Duff was the biggest winner that year. Like the shows before, it was not a ceremony, but a special feature on Radio Disney

Nominees and winners

Best Female Artist
Hilary Duff
Avril Lavigne
Jessica Simpson

Best Male Artist
Lil' Romeo
Aaron Carter
Bow Wow

Best Group
Destiny’s Child
Atomic Kitten
The Cheetah Girls

Best Song
"So Yesterday" – Hilary Duff
"The Tide Is High (Get the Feeling)" – Atomic Kitten
"Play Like Us" – Lil' Romeo

Best Song to Sing Hairbrush Karaoke
"Miss Independent" – Kelly Clarkson
"So Yesterday" – Hilary Duff
"Play Like Us" – Lil' Romeo

Best Song to Watch Your Dad Sing
"Naked Mole Rap" – Ron Stoppable and Rufus
"Play Like Us" – Lil' Romeo
"The Tide Is High (Get the Feeling)" – Atomic Kitten

Best Song That Makes You Turn Up the Radio
"So Yesterday" – Hilary Duff
"Miss Independent" – Kelly Clarkson
"I'm with You" – Avril Lavigne

Best Song to Air Guitar
"Sk8er Boi" – Avril Lavigne
"Girl Can Rock" – Hilary Duff
"Ultimate" – Lindsay Lohan

Best Video That Rocks
"So Yesterday" – Hilary Duff
"Sk8er Boi" – Avril Lavigne
"Miss Independent" – Kelly Clarkson

Best Song to Dance
"What I Like About You" – Lillix
"So Yesterday" – Hilary Duff
"Ultimate" – Lindsay Lohan

Female with Most Style
Hilary Duff
Amanda Bynes
Lindsay Lohan

Male with Most Style
Justin Timberlake
Aaron Carter
Lil' Romeo

References

External links
Official website

Radio Disney Music Awards
Radio Disney Music Awards
Radio Disney Music Awards
2003 awards in the United States